The French National Research and Safety Institute for the Prevention of Occupational Accidents and Diseases (French: Institut national de recherche et de sécurité, INRS) is a French association. It works under the auspices of the Caisse nationale de l’assurance maladie des travailleurs salariés (National Health Insurance Fund). Its board is composed of equal parts of representatives employers and representatives of the unions.

The main tasks of the INRS are:
 Conduct studies and research in the areas of safety and working conditions
 Publish reports to improve the health and safety of people at work
 Train technicians prevention

It produces and distributes many information media such as magazines (Travail et sécurité), forms with the professional world. It also has a role of expertise and training to improve safety conditions.

Platformization 2027: consequences of uberization on occupational health and safety. The summary of the results highlights a number of points for vigilance and opportunities in terms of occupational risk prevention.

Members 
 Active:
 French Democratic Confederation of Labour
 French Confederation of Management – General Confederation of Executives
 French Confederation of Christian Workers
 General Confederation of Labour
 General Confederation of Labour - Workers' Force
 Mouvement des Entreprises de France
 Professional Artisan Union (Union professionnelle artisanale)
 General Confederation of Small and Medium Enterprises (Confédération Générale des Petites et Moyennes Entreprises)
 Members of law:
 Director of the Directorate General of Labour
 The Director of Social Security representing the Minister of Social Affairs
 The budget director representing the Minister for the Budget
 Director of the National Health Insurance Fund for employees
 The Comptroller General Economic and Financial close INRS

References

External links 

 Official site

Medical and health organizations based in France
Occupational safety and health